Schaal, sometimes spelled Shaal or Shael, is a Sephardic Jewish Surname, common among Jews of French, East-European and Middle Eastern background, descended from Spanish exiles.

Etymology
The source of the name is debated. Some have linked it to the Hebrew phrase "shaal" (to ask, inquire). Some linguists argue that it is rooted in the ancient town ShaalBim as mentioned the bible as a "place of foxes" (Joshua 19:42), indicating that the Schaal name-bearers are members of the Cohen tribe. Due to phonetic differences the Schaal family members who lived in Salonika bore the name Shaul, Shoual or Shaoul, indicating that the name derives from King Shaul.

Since the 18th century, members of the family had settled predominantly in France, South-Eastern Europe and parts of Germany.

People

Schaal family of France
Schaal  is the name of a notable Jewish family descended from Spanish exiles who, after the expulsion of the Jews from Spain in 1492 and the following decades, settled in France and Germany. The family includes:
 François Ignace Schaal (1747–1833), French general and commander of the Republican army

Others
 Ben Zion Abba Shaul (1924-1998), Sephardic rabbi, Torah scholar, and halakhic arbiter
 Richard Schaal (1928–2014), American actor
 Wendy Schaal (born 1954), American actress
 Dror Shaul (born 1971), Israeli filmmaker
 Kristen Schaal (born 1978), American actress, voice actress, comedian, and writer

See also
 Marranos
 Crypto-Jews
 Spanish and Portuguese Jews
 Sephardim
 Ladino

References

Further reading
 Schechter, Ronald. Obstinate Hebrews: Representations of Jews in France, 1715–1815 (Univ of California Press, 2003)
  Graetz, Michael, and Jane Todd. The Jews in Nineteenth-Century France: From the French Revolution to the Alliance Israelite Universelle (1996)
 Ashtor, Eliyahu, The Jews of Moslem Spain, Vol. 2, Philadelphia: Jewish Publication Society of America (1979)
 Assis, Yom Tov, The Jews of Spain: From Settlement to Expulsion, Jerusalem: Hebrew University of Jerusalem|The Hebrew University of Jerusalem (1988)
 Baer, Yitzhak. A History of the Jews of Christian Spain. 2 vols. Jewish Publication Society of America (1966).

Jewish surnames
Jewish families
Sephardic surnames
People of Spanish-Jewish descent